Vellayani Paramu is a 1979 Indian Malayalam-language period drama film directed by J. Sasikumar, written by Pappanamkodu Lakshmanan, and produced by E. K. Thyagarajan. It is based on the life of Vellayani Paramu, an outlaw active in the Central Travancore region known for stealing from rich and giving to poor. The film stars Prem Nazir, Jayan, Jayabharathi and Adoor Bhasi. The film has musical score by G. Devarajan. The film was released on 23 February 1979.

Cast
Prem Nazir as Vellayani Paramu
Jayan as Jambulingam Nadar
Jayabharathi as Lekshmikutty
M. G. Soman as Ithikkara Pakki
Adoor Bhasi as 
Sreelatha Namboothiri as Ponnamma
Janardanan as Kottaram Sarvadhikari 
Shankaradi as Swamikal
Vazhoor Rajan
Manavalan Joseph  as Kesu
Stanly  
Thodupuzha Radhakrishnan 
Haripad Soman  
Santo Krishnan  
Kaval Surendran  
Meena  as Kalyaniyamma
Vanchiyoor Radha  as Pathumma
Sadhana as Janaki
 Mahesh
 Radhika
 Master Anilkumar
 Master Sherif
 Master Vijayakumar
 Baby Linisia
 Baby Priya

Soundtrack
The music was composed by G. Devarajan and the lyrics were written by Sreekumaran Thampi.

References

External links
 

1979 films
1970s Malayalam-language films
Films about outlaws
Indian historical drama films
History of Kerala on film
1970s historical drama films
Films set in the British Raj
Films shot in Kollam
Films shot in Alappuzha
Biographical films about bandits
Films directed by J. Sasikumar
1979 drama films